Salzland is a district in the middle of Saxony-Anhalt, Germany. It is bounded by (from the west and clockwise) the districts Harz, Börde, Magdeburg, Jerichower Land, Anhalt-Bitterfeld, Mansfeld-Südharz and Saalekreis.

History 
The district was established by merging the former districts of Bernburg, Schönebeck and Aschersleben-Staßfurt (except the town Falkenstein) as part of the reform of 2007.

Towns and municipalities 

The district Salzlandkreis consists of the following subdivisions:

References

External links 

 Das Informations-Portal für den Salzlandkreis